Anthony Currie (born November 12, 1957) is a Canadian former ice hockey forward who spent 8 seasons in the National Hockey League between 1977 and 1985 with the St. Louis Blues, Vancouver Canucks, and Hartford Whalers. Currie also spent several years in the minor leagues, and the last several years of his career were spent in Europe, where he played in Germany, Switzerland, and Italy, retiring in 1990.

Playing career
As a youth, Currie played in the 1970 Quebec International Pee-Wee Hockey Tournament with a minor ice hockey team from Oromocto.

Currie was a selected 63rd overall in the 1977 NHL amateur draft by the St. Louis Blues following a 73-goal season for the Portland Winter Hawks of the WHL. He would play 22 games for the Blues in 1977–78, and spend most of his first three professional seasons alternately dominating minor-pro and struggling to make an impact on the Blues. He would finally stake his claim to a roster spot in 1979–80, posting 19 goals in 40 games once called up to St. Louis. In 1980–81, he would have his finest NHL season recording 55 points in 61 games, helping the Blues to a 2nd place overall finish in the regular season. In the playoffs, he played the best hockey of his career, recording 16 points and a then franchise record 12 assists in 11 games.

However, Currie struggled throughout his career to maintain a consistent roster spot as coaches felt his poor defensive game and lack of size and physical play overshadowed his ability to create offense . He continued to produce well in 1981–82, notching 40 points in 48 games, before being dealt to the Vancouver Canucks at the trade deadline. He added 5 more goals for Vancouver to finish with 23 in just 60 games to match his career high from the previous season, but appeared in only 3 games in the playoffs as Vancouver went on a surprising run to the Stanley Cup Finals.

Not a favourite of defensive-minded Canuck coach Roger Neilson, and despite his high level of production to that point of his career, Currie found himself back in the minors for most of the next two seasons, appearing in only 26 more games for the team . Released by Vancouver mid-way through the 1983–84 season, Currie would get another chance to prove himself as he signed for the Hartford Whalers. He would again provide instant offense, posting 14 goals and 28 points in just 32 games for the Whalers. Despite posting 11 points in 13 games to start the 1984–85 campaign, he was waived by the Whalers. He would toil for two more seasons in the minors before moving to Europe, where he would finally retire in 1990.

Currie finished his NHL career with totals of 92 goals and 119 assists for 211 points in 290 NHL games, along with 73 penalty minutes.

He has two sons, the eldest Tyler and the youngest name Kyle.

Career statistics

Regular season and playoffs

References

External links

1957 births
Living people
Canadian expatriate ice hockey players in Germany
Canadian expatriate ice hockey players in Italy
Canadian ice hockey forwards
Edmonton Oil Kings (WCHL) players
EHC Kloten players
Fredericton Express players
Hartford Whalers players
HC Varese players
Ice hockey people from Nova Scotia
Nova Scotia Oilers players
Penticton Broncos players
Portland Winterhawks players
Salt Lake Golden Eagles (CHL) players
Sportspeople from the Cape Breton Regional Municipality
Spruce Grove Mets players
St. Louis Blues draft picks
St. Louis Blues players
Schwenninger Wild Wings players
Vancouver Canucks players
New Brunswick Sports Hall of Fame inductees